Millard is a surname, and may refer to:

Alan Millard (born 1937), British scholar of ancient Semitic languages
Benjamin Franklin Millard (1850–1926), American politician in Wisconsin
Bert Millard (1898–after 1925), British professional footballer
Bryan Millard (born 1960), American football player
Burton Millard (1828–1862), American politician in Wisconsin
Charles E. F. Millard (born 1957), American politician from New York
Charles Millard (1896–1978), Canadian trade union activist and politician
Christopher Sclater Millard (1872-1927), Bibliographer
Daryl Millard (born 1985), British rugby league player
Don Millard (born 1955), American electrical engineer
Ezra Millard (1833–1886), mayor of Omaha, Nebraska
Guy Millard (1917–2013), British diplomat
Helene Millard (1905–1974) American actress
Henry Millard (c.1796–1844), Texan revolutionary
Joseph Millard (1836–1922), U.S. Senator from Nebraska
Keith Millard (born 1962), American football player
Killick Millard (1870–1952), British euthanasia campaigner
Len Millard (1919–1997), British football player
Mike Millard (died 1990), 1970s and '80s U.S. bootleg recorder
Muriel Millard (1922–2014), Canadian actress, dancer, painter, singer-songwriter
Oscar Millard (1908–1990), British screenwriter
Naomi A. H. Millard (1914-1997), South African biologist
Pierre de Milard (1736–1778), also spelled Millard, French Navy officer, Burmese officer and governor
Ralph Millard (1919–2011), American plastic surgeon
Ross Millard (born 1982), British guitarist
Russ Millard (born 1973), American basketball player
Shane Millard (born 1975), British rugby league player
Spencer G. Millard (1856–1895), American politician from California
Stephen C. Millard (1841–1914), American politician from New York
Thomas Franklin Fairfax Millard (1868–1942), American war correspondent
Walter Samuel Millard (1864–1952), British entrepreneur and naturalist
William Millard (disambiguation), several people
[[Ellis Millard (1993-Present), Performer and Poet

English-language surnames